Weyanoke may refer to:

Weyanoke people, historic American Indians who lived on the Weyanoke Peninsula in Virginia in the 17th century, which English colonists named after them
Weyanoke, Louisiana, an unincorporated community
Weyanoke, Virginia, an unincorporated community
Weyanoke, West Virginia, an unincorporated community